Rüdiger Wolfrum (born 13 December 1941 in Berlin) is German jurist and the current professor of international law at the Heidelberg University Faculty of Law and director emeritus of the Heidelberg Max Planck Institute for Comparative Public Law and International Law. Wolfrum was a judge at the International Tribunal for the Law of the Sea from 1996 to 2017, serving as president of the court from 2005 to 2008.

Life
After his military duty, Wolfrum studied law at the universities of Tübingen and Bonn from 1964 to 1969. Passing his first state exam on 18 January 1969, he earned a PhD in International Law in 1973. Wolfrum served as Vice President of the German Research Foundation from 1996 to 2002, and as Vice President of the Max Planck Society from 2002 to 2006. In 1996, he was appointed Justice at the International Tribunal for the Law of the Sea; from 2005 to 2008 he has served as its president. Mr. Wolfrum is President of the German Society for International Law, and he has also been a member of numerous national and international councils and academies, such as the United Nations Committee on the Elimination of Racial Discrimination and the Institut de Droit International. Besides his numerous offices, he has instructed the High Justices of Afghanistan and Sudan, and he has acted as a United Nations mediator in the Darfur conflict. He holds honorary degrees of the Russian Academy of Sciences, of the Mongolian Shihutug Law College, the  University of Hamburg, and of the  University of Pretoria.  In 2008, he was awarded the Great Cross of Merit of the Federal Republic of Germany. Since January 2013 he is one of the managing directors of the Max Planck Foundation for International Peace and the Rule of Law.

Recent publications
Fighting terrorism at sea: options and limitations under international law. Japan Society for Defense Studies, Tokio 2008.
The protection of the environment through international courts and tribunals. In: Andreas Fischer-Lescano (Hrsg.): Frieden in Freiheit - Festschrift für Michael Bothe zum 70. Geburtstag. Nomos, Baden-Baden 2008, S. 807.
Kosovo - some thoughts on its future status. In: Sienho Yee (Hrsg.): Multiculturalism and international law - essays in honour of Edward McWhinney. Nijhoff, Leiden 2009, S. 561.

Lectures
 Legitimacy in International Law in the Lecture Series of the United Nations Audiovisual Library of International Law
 Environmental Law: Preservation of the Marine Environment in the Lecture Series of the United Nations Audiovisual Library of International Law
 Security at Sea in the Lecture Series of the United Nations Audiovisual Library of International Law
  (German)

See also
International Tribunal for the Law of the Sea
University of Heidelberg
Max Planck Society

External links
 MPIL - Homepage of Rüdiger Wolfrum

References

Commanders Crosses of the Order of Merit of the Federal Republic of Germany
1941 births
Living people
20th-century German judges
Jurists from Berlin
Members of the Institut de Droit International
Academic staff of Heidelberg University
Max Planck Institute for Comparative Public Law and International Law people
International law scholars
Members of the Committee on the Elimination of Racial Discrimination
International Tribunal for the Law of the Sea judges
German officials of the United Nations
German judges of United Nations courts and tribunals
21st-century German judges